The Honda Rafaga is a compact 4-door sedan sold exclusively in Japan by Honda, introduced in January 1993, and used the same 5-cylinder engine that was used in the Honda Inspire and the Honda Vigor and shared a platform with the second generation CE series Honda Ascot. "Rafaga" is Spanish for "gust" or "blustery". The engine is installed longitudinally, the same configuration used in the Vigor and Inspire. The Rafaga was third in Hondas hierarchy of sedans, and a sister car to the Ascot, which was sold at the Honda Primo dealership network. The Rafaga was sold in Japan at Honda Verno dealerships, and was one level up from the Honda Integra. As with other Honda products, the Rafaga used double wishbone suspension at the front and rear wheels. The "2.5 S" trim level came with a front suspension upper strut brace in the engine compartment. In Japan, the smaller G20A engine used regular grade fuel, while the larger G25A engine used premium grade fuel.

The Rafaga and the Ascot were introduced to serve as Honda's compact sedan for the Japanese market when the Accord's dimensions grew as a result of demand for the Accord in North America needing a wider car. Furthermore, due to the lengthwise installation of the five-cylinder engine, and the requirement that the overall length of the car comply with Japanese government regulations concerning cars classified as "compact", compromises were made with regards to rear passenger accommodations, and sales suffered as a result.

The grille is in the shape of an inverted triangle that flows into the front bumper, and a small Honda "H" logo at the top. The Rafaga also had a long and low front engine compartment due to the placement of the engine, and a short trunk, adding to its aerodynamic ambitions. Under Japanese Government exterior dimension regulations, the Rafaga was a compact sedan, thereby supplanting the previous Honda Accord, which grew in exterior dimensions slightly. This approach thereby redirected compact sedan buyers to Honda Verno and Honda Primo locations.

The interior came with genuine wood panels provided by Japanese furniture maker Tendo Mokko on the dashboard and center console, with leather available as an option on the "2.5 S". In 1994, dual airbags for front passengers and ABS were available, as well as a glass moonroof. The availability of two engine sizes offered Japanese buyers the choice of deciding how much annual road tax they were willing to pay; the larger 2.5 litre engine offered much higher levels of standard equipment to justify the higher tax liability.

As the recession began to take hold in Japan, known as the "bubble economy", and demand for the Accord remained strong, the Rafaga and the Ascot were discontinued and replaced with the Honda Torneo in 1997.

References

External links

 Honda | ASCOT / RAFAGA history 
 Facts and figures of the Honda Rafaga

Rafaga
Slanted engines
Compact cars
Front-wheel-drive vehicles